Godfrey Kennedy (born 1974) is a Zimbabwean sculptor.

Kennedy began sculpting in 1992, working with his neighbor, John Type. His work is also influenced by that of Moses Masaya and Brighton Sango.  Kennedy takes his subject matter from African history and culture.

References
Biographical sketch

1974 births
Living people
20th-century Zimbabwean sculptors
21st-century Zimbabwean sculptors
Place of birth missing (living people)
Date of birth missing (living people)